Taygetis virgilia is a species of butterfly of the family Nymphalidae. It is found from Mexico to Honduras, Colombia, Suriname and Guyana.

References

Butterflies described in 1776
Euptychiina
Nymphalidae of South America
Taxa named by Pieter Cramer